Namaste (Devanagari: नमस्ते), sometimes called namaskar and namaskaram, is a customary Hindu  non-contact manner of respectfully greeting and honouring a person or group, used at any time of day. It is found on the Indian subcontinent, and among the Nepalese and Indian diaspora. Namaste is usually spoken with a slight bow and hands pressed together, palms touching and fingers pointing upwards, thumbs close to the chest. This gesture is called añjali mudrā; the standing posture incorporating it is pranamasana.

Etymology, meaning and origins 

Namaste (Namas + te) is derived from Sanskrit and is a combination of the word namas and the second person dative pronoun in its enclitic form, te. The word namaḥ takes the sandhi form namas before the sound te.

It is found in the Vedic literature. Namas-krita and related terms appear in the Hindu scripture Rigveda such as in the Vivaha Sukta, verse 10.85.22 in the sense of "worship, adore", while Namaskara appears in the sense of "exclamatory adoration, homage, salutation and worship" in the Atharvaveda, the Taittiriya Samhita, and the Aitareya Brahmana. It is an expression of veneration, worship, reverence, an "offering of homage" and "adoration" in the Vedic literature and post-Vedic texts such as the Mahabharata. The phrase Namas-te appears with this meaning in Rigveda 8.75.10, Atharvaveda verse 6.13.2, Taittirya Samhita 2.6.11.2 and in numerous other instances in many early Hindu texts. It is also found in numerous ancient and medieval era sculpture and mandapa relief artwork in Hindu temples.

According to the Indologist Stephen Phillips, the terms "te and tvam" are an informal, familiar form of "you" in Sanskrit, and it is typically not used for unfamiliar adults. It is reserved for someone familiar, intimate, divine or a child. By using the dative form of tvam in the greeting Namas-te, there is an embedded secondary, metaphorical sense in the word. This is the basis of the pragmatic meaning of Namas-te, that is "salutations to the (divine) child (in your heart)", states Phillips.

In the contemporary era, namaḥ means 'bow', 'obeisance', 'reverential salutation' or 'adoration' and te means 'to you' (singular dative case of 'tvam'). Therefore, namaste literally means "bowing to you". In Hinduism, it also has a spiritual import reflecting the belief that "the divine and self (atman, Self) is same in you and me", and connotes "I bow to the divine in you". According to sociologist Holly Oxhandler, it is a Hindu term which means "the sacred in me recognizes the sacred in you".

A less common variant is used in the case of three or more people being addressed namely Namo vaḥ which is a combination of namaḥ and the enclitic second person plural pronoun vaḥ. The word namaḥ takes the sandhi form namo before the sound v. An even less common variant is used in the case of two people being addressed, namely, Namo vām, which is a combination of namaḥ and the enclitic second person dual pronoun vām.

History
Excavations at various Indus Valley Civilisation have revealed some male and female terracotta figures in namaste posture. These archaeological findings are dated to the Mature Harappan.

Anjali Mudra
The gesture of folding hands during a namaste is called the Añjali Mudrā. In addition to namaste, this mudra is one of the postures found in Indian classical dance such as Bharatanatyam, and in yoga practice. It is widely found in Indian temple reliefs and sculpture in mandapam, at entrances and iconography such as the Lingobhavamurti of Shaivism. The Anjali mudra differs from namaste by being a non-verbal gesture, while namaste can be said with or without any gesture. According to Bhaumik and Govil, the Anjali mudra and Namaskara mudra are very similar but have a subtle difference. The back of the thumbs in Anjali mudra face the chest and are perpendicular to other fingers, while the thumbs in Namaskara mudra are aligned with the other fingers.

Anjali mudra is described in Sanskrit texts such as in verse 9.127–128 of the Natya Shastra (200 BCE – 200 CE), in temple architecture texts dated after the sixth-century CE such as in verse 5.67 of the Devata murti prakarana and those on painting called the Citrasutras. The Natya Shastra, a classical Indian dance text, describes it to be a posture where the two hands are folded together in a reverential state and that this is used to pray before a deity, receive any person one reveres and also to greet friends. The Natya Shastra further states that for prayers inside a temple, the Anjali mudra should be placed near one's head or above, while meeting someone venerable it is placed in front of one's face or chin, and for friends near one's chest.

Uses
The gesture is widely used throughout the Indian subcontinent, parts of Asia and beyond where people of South and Southeast Asian origins have migrated. Namaste is used as a respectful form of greeting, acknowledging and welcoming a relative, guest or stranger. In some contexts, namaste is used by one person to express gratitude for assistance offered or given, and to thank the other person for his or her generous kindness.

Namaskar is also part of the 16 upacharas used inside temples or any place of formal Puja (worship). Namaste in the context of deity worship, scholars conclude, has the same function as in greeting a guest or anyone else. It expresses politeness, courtesy, honor, and hospitality from one person to the other. It is used in goodbyes as well.  This is sometimes expressed, in ancient Hindu scriptures such as Taittiriya Upanishad, as Atithi Devo Bhava (literally, treat the guest like a god).

Namaste is one of the six forms of pranama, and in parts of India these terms are used synonymously.

Since namaste is a non-contact form of greeting, Israeli Prime Minister Benjamin Netanyahu suggested using the gesture as an alternative to hand shaking during the 2020 Coronavirus pandemic as a means to prevent the spread of the virus.

Gallery

See also
 Culture of India
 Pranāma
 Sat Sri Akal
 Gassho
 Sampeah
 Sembah
 Wai

References

External links 

 The Meaning of Namaste Yoga Journal
 Saying goodbye in different languages- Namaste
 Modes of Greetings in Kashmiri, Indian Institute of Language Studies
Ancient Indus Valley Seal print showing Namaste/anjali mudra, CSU Chico

Bowing
Cultural conventions
Greetings
Gestures of respect
Greeting words and phrases
Greeting words and phrases of India
Greeting words and phrases of Nepal
Hand gestures
Human communication
Indian traditions
Mudras
Phrases
Parting phrases
Salutes
Traditions
Nepali words and phrases